Adelaide Town Hall is a landmark building on King William Street in Adelaide, South Australia, Australia. The City of Adelaide Town Hall complex includes the Town Hall and the office building at 25 Pirie Street.

Description and history

Adelaide Town Hall was designed by Edmund Wright and E. J. Woods, with construction by Charles Farr commencing in 1863 and completed in 1866. The tower, whose foundation stone was laid on 13 January 1864, is named after Prince Albert and is slightly shorter than the Victoria Tower of the GPO on the other side of King William Street. Townsend Duryea's famous Panorama of 1865 was taken from the Albert Tower. The clock, by Thomas Gaunt & Co of Melbourne, was donated by Lavington Bonython and installed in 1935.

The Adelaide Town Hall was the venue on 1 August 1895 for the inaugural meeting of the Australasian Federation League of South Australia, this organisation having been formed at a meeting convened seven months earlier by the Australian Natives' Association in the colony. This league was the principal organisation that campaigned in favour of federation in South Australia. The meeting at the Town Hall was a major public gathering attended by many prominent South Australians. The meeting was also notable for the large number of women who attended.

The hall is famous for an appearance by The Beatles on the balcony in 1964, which attracted an estimated 300,000 fans, their biggest crowd. It serves as the seat of the Adelaide City Council, a principal venue for concerts with the Adelaide Symphony Orchestra, and has function centre facilities available for hire. As a venue for symphony concerts, its acoustics and sense of history have often been praised.

Adelaide Town Hall is listed on the Register of the National Estate.

Pipe organ 

After the official opening in 1866, a campaign began to obtain a pipe organ for the Auditorium. The city's amateur musicians held two concerts which raised £120 for the Organ Fund, only to see the money used to settle the outstanding account for the Albert Bells instead. In 1869, the Adelaide Philharmonic Society was formed and the choir staged 25 concerts over the next six years to raise over £500 for the Organ Fund. The estimated cost of the organ was £1,200 and the council had promised to contribute £600.  In 1875 Council ordered an organ from the London manufacturers, William Hill & Son. As a compromise on the cost, the Council decided to have Hill & Son construct the organ so that it could be added to in later years. The total cost came to £2106.16s.9d. The opening concert was held on 2 October 1877 but it wasn't long before a campaign to enlarge the organ by adding solo stops began and this upgrade was completed in 1885. The hydraulic engine was replaced in 1923 by an electric motor but after frequent criticism that it was out of date, clumsy of operation, and needed complete retuning to international standard pitch, the Council eventually voted to replace the original century-old pipe organ, with a new one manufactured by J.W. Walker and Sons, of Brandon, Suffolk, England, and installed in 1989.

Initially the post of City Organist was an honorary one, with George Oughton on the stool from 1879 to 1884 and T. H. Jones from 1885 to 1891. When it became a salaried position, it would have been expected that Jones be appointed, but it went instead to W. R. Pybus, who served from May 1891 to September 1917. Jones then followed, from 1917 to 1923, W. R. Knox  1923–1928, John Dempster 1929–1932 and Harold Wylde 1932–1966, succeeded by J. V. Peters.

In art
A watercolor of the Town Hall painted by the English artist Edmund Gouldsmith was made the subject of a 43 cent postage stamp by the Australian Post Office in 1990.

References

Buildings and structures in Adelaide
Tourist attractions in Adelaide
History of Adelaide
South Australian places listed on the defunct Register of the National Estate
Neoclassical architecture in Australia
Town halls in South Australia
South Australian Heritage Register